Van der Plas is a Dutch toponymic surname meaning "from the pool / pond / lake". People with this name include:

Caroline van der Plas (born 1967), Dutch politician
Charles van der Plas (1891–1977), Dutch Governor of East Java from 1936 to 1941
David van der Plas (1647–1704), Dutch portrait painter
Debora van der Plas (1616–1680), Dutch-born Swedish businesswoman
Frank van der Plas (born 1960), Dutch comedic actor and singer performing as Ome Henk
Pieter van der Plas I (c.1590–c.1661), painter active in Brussels

See also
Parlevliet & van der Plas, international fisheries company
Vanden Plas, British luxury motor vehicle manufacturer of Belgian origin
Vanden Plas (band), German progressive metal band

References

Dutch-language surnames
Dutch toponymic surnames